Nerita tessellata, sometimes known as the checkered nerite, is a species of tropical sea snail with a gill and an operculum, a nerite, a marine gastropod mollusk in the family Neritidae, the nerites.

Distribution 
This nerite occurs on the shores of the Western Atlantic Ocean including Florida, Puerto Rico, Mexico, Belize, Honduras, Costa Rica, Panama, Colombia, Venezuela, the West Indies and Brazil.

Habitat
This species lives high up in the intertidal zone on rocks.

Description
The shell of this nerite can be as large as 25 mm. The background shell color is black, usually with white markings. Fairly often the white markings are regularly spaced, and make the shell look checkered or tesselated (tiled), hence the specific name of this species.

References

Neritidae
Gastropods described in 1791
Taxa named by Johann Friedrich Gmelin